The 1953 Montana Grizzlies football team represented the University of Montana in the 1953 college football season as a member of the Skyline Conference. The Grizzlies were led by second-year head coach Ed Chinske, played their home games at Dornblaser Field and finished the season with a record of three wins and five losses (3–5, 2–4 Skyline).

Schedule

References

Montana
Montana Grizzlies football seasons
Montana Grizzlies football